The Province of Verona is a province in the Veneto administrative region of Italy. On its northwestern border, Lake GardaItaly's largestis divided between Verona and the provinces of Brescia (Lombardy region) and Trentino (Trentino-Alto Adige/Südtirol region). Its capital is the city of Verona. The city is a UNESCO World Heritage Site. 

The province is cosmopolitan in nature. It is bordered by Italian Tyrol in the north, Province of Vicenza and Province of Padua in the east. Province of Rovigo and Province of Mantua in south and Lake Garda in the west. From north to south the maximum extent of the province is 50 miles while it is 25 miles from east to west.

Overview 

There are 98 comuni (singular: comune) in the province. Important comuni include Bovolone, Bonavigo, Bussolengo, Cerea, Isola della Scala, Legnago, Negrar, Peschiera del Garda, San Bonifacio, San Giovanni Lupatoto, San Martino Buon Albergo, Soave, Sona, Valeggio sul Mincio and Villafranca di Verona.

William Shakespeare's play Romeo and Juliet takes place in Verona, as do some scenes in his play The Two Gentlemen of Verona. Verona attracts many tourists, and the Casa di Giulietta (Juliet Capulet's villa in the play) is an important local visitor attraction. 

Due to its historic importance, the province boasts a large number of castles, towers, hermitages, monasteries, sanctuaries, and old Romanesque parishes. A regional park is located in Lessinia. Valpolicella is popular for its wines which are made from indigenous techniques. Europe's biggest natural bridge-Ponte di Veja is located in the province. The northern part of the province is mostly hilly, with several rivers, including Tartaro, Caslagnaro and Adige.

References

External links 

 Tourist information

 
Verona